Movie Edit Pro (also known as Magix Video Deluxe in Europe) is a video editing software developed by Magix for semi-professional and DIY users for Windows PC. It is the best selling video software in Europe, and is most famous for its ease-of-learn and rendering stability. The first version was published in 2001. According to the developer, it applied the principles of non-destructiveness and object orientation to a video editing program for the first time.

The latest versions are Movie Edit Pro 2019, Movie Edit Pro Plus 2019, Movie Edit Pro Premium 2019. 

The last update was released on December 10, 2018  which added dynamic title animation and free design colors for tracks and objects in a video.

Features (Version 2019)

Similarities of both Versions 
 miniDV, HDV and AVCHD compatible
 4K support
 storyboard and timeline-oriented editing
 freely adjustable user interface
 Screenshot
 one way color correction
 title editor
 Keyframing
 batch processing
 burn DVD and Blu-ray Disc with animated menus
 AVCHD disc export
 Scrubbing
 Chroma keying
 Upload to YouTube and Vimeo in Full HD

Features (version 2019) 
 Dynamic title animation
 Active destination track import
 INTEL GPU hardware acceleration
 openFX support
 64-bit support
 Export to SD cards
 H.264 decoding
 improved Image stabilization
 Xavcs video compatibility
 Chroma keying
 Burn to DVD, AVCHD or Blu-ray disc
 Scrubbing
 4K support

Differences between both Versions

Supported file formats

System requirements https://www.magix.com/us/video-editor/movie-studio/specifications/ System requirements for Movie Studio 2023 (then called Movie Edit Pro)

Minimum 
 Processor with 2.0 GHz
 1 GB RAM
 2 GB free hard disk memory and a DVD drive for program installation
 Graphics card with a screen resolution of at least 1024 x 768
 Internet connection required for activating and validating the program

Recommended 
 Quad-core processor with 2.8 GHz
 4 GB RAM
 Dedicated graphics card with 512 MB memory

Supported devices 
 FireWire interface for use with DV/HDV camcorders
 USB camcorders (DVD/hard disk/memory card) and webcams
 Video, TV or graphics card with a video input for digitizing analog sources
 Blu-ray, DVD-R/RW, DVD+R/RW, DVD-RAM or CD-R/RW burners

References

Video editing software
Windows multimedia software
Magix software